Rhino Video Games was a video game retailer headquartered in Gainesville, Florida before being sold to GameStop in 2007.  Rhino operated more than 90 games stores that carried classic games as well as newer products in fifteen states throughout the U.S. From 1989 to 2007, Rhino Video Games allowed customers to trade in their unwanted video games and systems toward other video game merchandise.

History

Origins
The first Rhino store was opened in 1989 in Ocala, Florida. Mike Vorce (founder and President), with the help of Bruce Ruckle, created a specialty video game store focused on buying, selling, trading, and renting video game software, systems, and accessories. By 1992, a second location was opened in Gainesville, which would become a flagship store and eventually the site for the company's corporate headquarters and distribution center. Vorce recruited Kelly Sharp (Senior Vice President) that year and together they oversaw all aspects of the company's growth, including operations, finance, HR, marketing, supply chain management, real estate, etc.

By 1996, Vorce and Sharp had expanded Rhino to five locations in Florida and enlisted Tully McQueen (Vice President of Operations) to assist in overseeing day to day store operations as they prepared for further expansion. This established the executive management trio that would continue to lead Rhino through future expansion, success, and acquisition by Blockbuster, Inc. In 1997, Rhino opened its first location outside of Florida, in Brunswick, GA. By 2004, Rhino Video Games had approximately 40 locations across six states in the southeast, employing over 300 people at its stores, corporate office, and distribution center, and attracted the interest of several potential buyers, including GameStop, EB Games, and Blockbuster.

Sale to GameStop
On January 4, 2007, Rhino Video Games was acquired by GameStop and all stores were renamed by January 14th.

References

External links
 Rhino Video Games at the Internet Archive

GameStop
Video game retailers of the United States
American companies established in 1989
Retail companies established in 1989
American companies disestablished in 2007
Retail companies disestablished in 2007
Companies based in Florida
2007 mergers and acquisitions